Shad Bolagh (also Romanized as Shād Bolāgh; also known as Shāhbodāgh) is a village in Harasam Rural District, Homeyl District, Eslamabad-e Gharb County, Kermanshah Province, Iran. At the 2006 census, its population was 293, in 59 families.

References 

Populated places in Eslamabad-e Gharb County